This topic reveals a large number of triathlon events and their results for 2017.

2017 ITU World Triathlon Series

 March 3 & 4: WTS #1 in  Abu Dhabi
 Elite winners:  Javier Gómez Noya (m) /  Andrea Hewitt (f)
 April 8 & 9: WTS #2 in  Gold Coast, Queensland
 Elite winners:  Mario Mola (m) /  Andrea Hewitt (f)
 May 13 & 14: WTS #3 in  Yokohama
 Elite winners:  Mario Mola (m) /  Flora Duffy (f)
 June 10 & 11: WTS #4 in  Leeds
 Elite winners:  Alistair Brownlee (m) /  Flora Duffy (f)
 July 15 & 16: WTS #5 in  Hamburg
 Elite winners:  Mario Mola (m) /  Flora Duffy (f)
 July 28 & 29: WTS #6 in  Edmonton
 Elite winners:  Mario Mola (m) /  Flora Duffy (f)
 August 5 & 6: WTS #7 in  Montreal
 Elite winners:  Javier Gómez Noya (m) /  Ashleigh Gentle (f)
 August 26 & 27: WTS #8 in  Stockholm
 Elite winners:  Jonny Brownlee (m) /  Flora Duffy (f)
 September 14 – 17: WTS Grand Final (#9) in  Rotterdam
 Elite winners:  Vincent Luis (m) /  Flora Duffy (f)
 Junior winners:  Matthew Hauser (m) /  Taylor Knibb (f)
 U23 winners:  Raphael Montoya (m) /  Tamara Gorman (f)

World triathlon championships

 July 15 & 16: 2017 ITU Mixed Relay World Championships in  Hamburg
 4x Mixed Relay winners:  (Charlotte McShane, Matthew Hauser, Ashleigh Gentle, & Jacob Birtwhistle)
 August 18 – 27: 2017 ITU Multisport World Championships in  Penticton (debut event)
 Aquathlon
 Elite winners:  Matthew Sharpe (m) /  Emma Pallant (f)
 Junior winners:  Aiden Longcroft-Harris (m) /  Delia Sclabas (f)
 U23 winners:  Brennen Smith (m) /  Chloe Pollard (f)
 Cross triathlon
 Elite winners:  Francisco Serrano (m) /  Melanie McQuaid (f)
 Junior winners:  Alec Davison (m) /  Holly Henry (f)
 U23 winners:  Kyle Smith (m) /  Penny Slater (f)
 Duathlon
 Elite winners:  Benoit Nicolas (m) /  Felicity Sheedy-Ryan (f)
 Junior winners:  Cameron Richardson (m) /  Delia Sclabas (f)
 U23 winners:  Richard Allen (m) /  Lucie Picard (f)
 Long distance triathlon
 Elite winners:  Lionel Sanders (m) /  Sarah Crowley (f)
 September 3: 2017 Zofingen ITU Powerman Long Distance Duathlon World Championships in 
 Elite winners:  Maxim Kuzmin (m) /  Emma Pooley (f)

Regional triathlon championships

 February 25 & 26: 2017 Havana CAMTRI Middle Distance Triathlon Iberoamerican Championships in 
 Elite winners:  Michel Gonzalez Castro (m) /  Yadira Corona Cabrera (f; default)
 March 4: 2017 Playa Hermosa CAMTRI Triathlon Junior Central American and Caribbean Championships in 
 Junior winners:  David Marin (m) /  Raquel Solis Guerrero (f)
 March 11: 2017 Sarasota CAMTRI Triathlon Junior North American Championships in the 
 Junior winners:  Darr Smith (m) /  JEONG Hye-rim (f)
 March 19: 2017 Montevideo CAMTRI Triathlon Youth & Junior South American Championships in 
 Junior winners:  Diego Moya (m) /  Miranda Moira (f)
 Youth winners:  Juan Santiago Girard (m) /  Delfina Orlandini (f)
 March 19: 2017 Montevideo CAMTRI Sprint Triathlon American Cup & Iberoamerican and South American Championship in 
 Elite winners:  Manoel Messias (m) /  Camila Alonso (f)
 April 7 & 8: 2017 Sharm El Sheikh ATU Sprint Triathlon African Cup and Pan Arab Championships in 
 Elite winners:  Vladimir Turbayevskiy (m) /  Elena Danilova (f)
 Junior winners:  Kouzkouz Nabil (m) /  Rehab Hamdy (f)
 Youth winners:  Khaled Walid (m) /  Syrine Fattoum (f)
 April 23: 2017 Bridgetown CAMTRI Sprint Triathlon American Cup and Central American and Caribbean Championship in 
 Elite winners:  Cesar Saracho (m) /  Lindsey Jerdonek (f)
 July 2: 2017 Altafulla ETU Triathlon European Cup and Mediterranean Championships in 
 Elite winners:  Uxio Abuin Ares (m) /  Summer Cook (f)
 July 7 – 9: 2017 Ruse ETU Aquathlon and Triathlon Balkan Championships in 
 Aquathlon Elite winners:  Andrei Sergiu Chis (m) /  Buse Aygün (f; default)
 Triathlon Elite winners:  Ognjen Stojanović (m) /  Marie Elias (f)
 July 29 & 30: 2017 Astana ASTC Sprint Triathlon Asian Cup and Central Asian Championships in 
 Elite winners:  Marcel Walkington (m) /  Zsanett Bragmayer (f)
 August 13: 2017 Riga ETU Triathlon Baltic Championships in 
 Elite winners:  Mikita Katsianeu (m) /  Vira Sosnova (f)
 September 2 & 3: 2017 Fredericia ETU Nordic Triathlon Championships in 
 Elite winners:  Andreas Schilling (m) /  Amanda Bohlin (f)
 October 5 & 6: 2017 Aqaba ASTC Sprint Triathlon Asian Cup and West Asian Championships in 
 Elite winners:  Marcel Walkington (m) /  Yuliya Yelistratova (f)

2017 ITU Triathlon World Cup

 February 11 & 12: TWC #1 in  Cape Town
 Elite winners:  Richard Murray (m) /  Lucy Hall (f)
 March 11 & 12: TWC #2 in  Mooloolaba
 Elite winners:  Luke Willian (m) /  Emma Jackson (f)
 April 1 & 2: TWC #3 in  New Plymouth
 Elite winners:  Richard Murray (m) /  Katie Zaferes (f)
 May 6 & 7: TWC #4 in  Chengdu
 Elite winners:  Matthew Hauser (m) /  Non Stanford (f)
 May 27 & 28: TWC #5 in  Madrid
 Elite winners:  Ryan Sissons (m) /  Georgia Taylor-Brown (f)
 June 3 & 4: TWC #6 in  Cagliari
 Elite winners:  Adrien Briffod (m) /  Jolanda Annen (f)
 July 22 & 23: TWC #7 in  Tiszaújváros
 Elite winners:  Bence Bicsák (m) /  Renee Tomlin (f)
 August 12 & 13: TWC #8 in  Mérida, Yucatán
 Elite winners:  Irving Pérez (m) /  Summer Cook (f)
 September 2 & 3: TWC #9 in  Karlovy Vary
 Elite winners:  Gustav Iden (m) /  Gillian Backhouse (f)
 September 23 & 24: TWC #10 in  Huelva
 Elite winners:  Justus Nieschlag (m) /  Vendula Frintová (f)
 September 30 & October 1: TWC #11 in  Weihai
 Elite winners:  Uxio Abuin Ares (m) /  Jolanda Annen (f)
 October 7 & 8: TWC #12 in  Sarasota-Bradenton
 Elite winners:  Rodrigo González (m) /  Juri Ide (f)
 October 28 & 29: TWC #13 in  Salinas, Ecuador
 Elite winners:  Crisanto Grajales (m) /  Elizabeth Bravo (f)
 October 28 & 29: TWC #14 in  Tongyeong
 Elite winners:  Aurelien Raphael (m) /  Summer Cook (f)
 November 4 & 5: TWC #15 (final) in  Miyazaki
 Elite winners:  Marten Van Riel (m) /  Summer Cook (f)

European Triathlon Union (ETU)

 January 28 & 29: 2017 Otepää ETU Winter Triathlon European Championships in 
 Elite winners:  Pavel Andreev (m) /  Helena Erbenová (f)
 Junior winners:  Aleksandr Vasilev (m) /  Polina Tarakanova (f)
 U23 winners:  Roman Vasin (m) /  Daria Rogozina (f)
 April 29 & 30: 2017 Soria ETU Duathlon European Championships in 
 Elite winners:  Emilio Martin (m) /  Sandra Levenez (f)
 Junior winners:  Alex Yee (m) /  Delia Sclabas (f)
 U23 winners:  Richard Allen (m) /  Lucie Picard (f)
 May 21: 2017 Sankt Wendel ETU Powerman Middle Distance Duathon European Championships in 
 Elite winners:  Felix Köhler (m) /  Emma Pooley (f)
 May 27: 2017 Bratislava ETU Aquathlon European Championships in 
 Elite winners:  Richard Varga (m) /  Hannah Kitchen (f)
 Junior winners:  Gergő Soós (m) /  Kristina Jesenska (f)
 U23 winners:  Márk Dévay (m) /  Romana Gajdošová (f)
 June 10: 2017 Herning ETU Challenge Middle Distance Triathlon European Championships in 
 Elite winners:  Patrick Dirksmeier (m) /  Camilla Pedersen (f)
 June 16 – 18: 2017 Kitzbühel ETU Triathlon European Championships in 
 Elite winners:  João Pereira (m) /  Jessica Learmonth (f)
 Junior winners:  Vasco Vilaça (m) /  Kate Waugh (f)
 June 24 & 25: 2017 Düsseldorf ETU Sprint Triathlon European Championships in 
 Elite winners:  João José Pereira (m) /  Laura Lindemann (f)
 July 13 – 16: 2017 Panevėžys ETU Triathlon Youth European Championships Festival in 
 Youth winners:  Daniel Slater (m) /  Jessica Fullagar (f)
 Youth 4x Mixed Relay winners:  (Freya Thomson, Daniel Slater, Abbie Williams, & Matthew Willis)
 July 23: 2017 Banyoles ETU Triathlon Clubs European Championships in 
 4x Mixed Relay winners:  S.L. Benfica
 Junior 4x Mixed Relay winners:  Cidade de Lugo Fluvial
 July 27 & 28: 2017 Târgu Mureș ETU Cross Duathlon European Championships in 
 Elite winners:  Brice Daubord (m) /  Sanne Broeksma (f)
 Junior winners:  Miquel Riusech (m) /  Marta Menditto (f)
 U23 winners:  Szabolcs Kovacs (m) /  Daria Rogozina (f)
 July 27 – 30: 2017 Târgu Mureș ETU Cross Triathlon European Championships in 
 Elite winners:  Marcello Ugazio (m) /  Brigitta Poór (f)
 Junior winners:  Filippo Pradella (m) /  Sofiya Pryyma (f)
 U23 winners:  Marcello Ugazio (m) /  Daria Rogozina (f)
 August 5 & 6: 2017 Velence ETU U23 Triathlon European Championships in 
 U23 winners:  Bence Bicsák (m) /  Georgia Taylor-Brown (f)
 U23 4x Mixed Relay winners:  (Georgia Taylor-Brown, Samuel Dickinson, Sian Rainsley, & James Teagle)
 September 9: 2017 Almere-Amsterdam ETU Challenge Long Distance Triathlon European Championships in the 
 Elite winners:  Joe Skipper (m) /  Yvonne van Vlerken (f)

American Triathlon Confederation (CAMTRI)

 March 11: 2017 Sarasota CAMTRI Sprint Triathlon and Mixed Relay American Championships in the 
 Elite winners:  Rodrigo González (m) /  Joanna Brown (f)
 March 11: 2017 Sarasota CAMTRI Paratriathlon American Championship in the 
 PT1 winners:  Fernando Aranha (m) /  Mary Catherine Callahan (f)
 PT2 winners:  Mark Barr (m) /  Allysa Seely (f)
 PT3 winners:  Brian Norberg (m) /  Fernanda Katheline Pereira (f; default)
 PT4 winners:  Jamie Brown (m) /  Patricia Collins (f)
 PT5 winners:  Chris Hammer (m) /  Grace Norman (f)
 PT6 winners:  Aaron Scheidies (m) /  Elizabeth Baker (f)
 July 15: 2017 Magog CAMTRI Triathlon Junior American Championships in 
 Junior winners:  Darr Smith (m) /  Desirae Ridenour (f)
 October 22: 2017 Puerto López CAMTRI Triathlon American Championships in 
 Elite winners:  Manoel Messias (m) /  Sophie Chase (f)
 U23 winners:  Manoel Messias (m) /  Sophie Chase (f)

Oceania Triathlon Union (OTU)

 February 12: 2017 Kinloch OTU Sprint Triathlon Oceania Championships in 
 Elite winners:  Ryan Sissons (m) /  Emma Jackson (f)
 U23 winners:  Sam Ward (m) /  Emma Jeffcoat (f)
 March 4 & 5: 2017 Perth OTU Triathlon Junior Oceania Championships in 
 Junior winners:  Matthew Hauser (m) /  Joanne Miller (f)
 4xMixed Relay Junior winners:  (Samantha Whitting, Matthew Hauser, Joanne Miller, & Nicholas Free)
 March 18: 2017 Devonport OTU Triathlon Oceania Championships in 
 Elite winners:  Matthew Baker (m) /  Emma Jeffcoat (f)
 U23 winners:  Matthew Baker (m) /  Emma Jeffcoat (f)

Asian Triathlon Confederation (ASTC)

 March 4 & 5: 2017 Putrajaya ASTC Powerman Middle Distance Duathlon Asian Championships in 
 Elite winners:  Thomas Bruins (m) /  Annamária Eberhardt-Halász (f)
 April 29 & 30: 2017 Subic Bay ASTC Paratriathlon Asian Championships in the 
 Note: There was no PTS3 and Women's PTS5 events here.
 PTHC winners:  Jumpei Kimura (m) /  Wakako Tsuchida (f; default)
 PTS2 winners:  Kenshiro Nakayama (m) /  Yukako Hata (f; default)
 PTS4 winners:  Hideki Uda (m) /  Mami Tani (f; default)
 Men's PTS5 winner:  Keiichi Sato (m; default)
 PTVI winners:  CHU Kin Wa (m) /  Atsuko Maruo (f; default)
 July 22 & 23: 2017 Palembang ASTC Triathlon Asian Championships in 
 Elite winners:  Jumpei Furuya (m) /  Yuko Takahashi (f)
 Junior winners:  Oscar Coggins (m) /  Fuka Sega (f)
 U23 winners:  Koki Yamamoto (m) /  Hiraku Fukuoka (f)

African Triathlon Union (ATU)

 May 6 & 7: 2017 Hammamet ATU Triathlon African Championships in 
 Elite winners:  Alexander Bryukhankov (m) /  Gillian Sanders (f)
 Junior winners:  Matthew Greer (m) /  Jayme-Sue Vermaas (f)
 U23 winners:  Badr Siwane (m) /  Celeste Renaud (f)
 Youth winners:  Edouard Starck (m) /  Syrine Fattoum (f)

2017 ITU World Paratriathlon Series

 April 8: WPS #1 in  Gold Coast
 Note: There was no women's PTS3 event here.
 PTHC winners:  Jetze Plat (m) /  Emily Tapp (f)
 PTS2 winners:  Stéphane Bahier (m) /  Allysa Seely (f)
 Men's PTS3 winner:  Justin Godfrey
 PTS4 winners:  Alexis Hanquinquant (m) /  Sally Pilbeam (f)
 PTS5 winners:  Chris Hammer (m) /  Kate Doughty (f; default)
 PTVI winners:  Jonathan Goerlach (m) /  Elizabeth Baker (f)
 May 13: WPS #2 in  Yokohama
 PTHC winners:  Geert Schipper (m) /  Wakako Tsuchida (f)
 PTS2 winners:  Andrew Lewis (m) /  Allysa Seely (f)
 PTS3 winners:  Daniel Molina (m) /  Anna Plotnikova (f)
 PTS4 winners:  Jamie Brown (m) /  Mami Tani (f)
 PTS5 winners:  Chris Hammer (m) /  Kate Doughty (f)
 PTVI winners:  Dave Ellis (m) /  Alison Patrick (f)
 July 28: WPS #3 in  Edmonton
 Note: There was no women's PTS3 event here.
 PTWC winners:  Geert Schipper (m) /  Emily Tapp (f)
 PTS2 winners:  Geoffrey Wersy (m) /  Liisa Lilja (f)
 Men's PTS3 winner:  Ryan Taylor
 PTS4 winners:  Steven Crowley (m) /  Mami Tani (f)
 PTS5 winners:  Stefan Daniel (m) /  Grace Norman (f)
 PTVI winners:  Aaron Scheidies (m) /  Katie Kelly (f)

2017 ITU Paratriathlon World Cup

 June 4: PWC #1 in  Besançon
 Note: There was no women's PTS4 event here.
 PTHC winners:  Ahmed Andaloussi (m) /  Mona Francis (f; default)
 PTS2 winners:  Stefan Loesler (m) /  Veronica Yoko Plebani (f; default)
 PTS3 winners:  Max Gelhaar (m) /  Elise Marc (f)
 Men's PTS4 winner:  Alexis Hanquinquant
 PTS5 winners:  Alexandr Ialchik (m) /  Gwladys Lemoussu (f)
 PTVI winners:  Federico Sicura (m) /  Lena Dieter (f)
 July 2: PWC #2 in  Altafulla
 Note: There was no women's PTS3 event here.
 PTWC winners:  Ahmed Andaloussi (m) /  Eva María Moral Pedrero (f)
 PTS2 winners:  Geoffrey Wersy (m) /  Laia Casino Puiggali (f; default)
 Men's PTS3 winner:  Joaquin Carrasco (default)
 PTS4 winners:  Steven Crowley (m) /  Mami Tani (f)
 PTS5 winners:  Jairo Ruiz Lopez (m) /  Claire Cashmore (f)
 PTVI winners:  Héctor Catalá Laparra (m) /  Susana Rodriguez (f)
 July 8: PWC #3 in  Iseo-Franciacorta
 Note: There was no women's PTS4 event here.
 PTWC winners:  Giovanni Achenza (m) /  Karen Darke (f)
 PTS2 winners:  Stephane Bahier (m) /  Liisa Lilja (f)
 PTS3 winners:  Antun Bošnjaković (m) /  Anna Plotnikova (f)
 Men's PTS4 winner:  Alexis Hanquinquant
 PTS5 winners:  Jairo Ruiz Lopez (m) /  Lauren Steadman (f)
 PTVI winners:  Lazar Filipovic (m) /  Anna Barbaro (f)
 July 15: PWC #4 in  Magog
 Note: There was no PTS3, women's PTS2, women's PTS4, & women's PTS5 events here.
 PTWC winners:  Howie Sanborn (m) /  Emily Tapp (f; default)
 Men's PTS2 winner:  Allan Armstrong
 Men's PTS4 winner:  Joel Rosinbum
 Men's PTS5 winner:  Stefan Daniel
 PTVI winners:  Jon Dunkerley (m) /  Amy Dixon (f)
 October 8: PWC #5 (final) in  Sarasota, Florida
 Note: There was no PTS3 events for men and women here.
 PTWC winners:  Benjamin Lenatz (m) /  Ahalya Lettenberger (f)
 PTS2 winners:  Andrew Lewis (m) /  Yukako Hata (f)
 PTS4 winners:  Oliver Dreier (m) /  Andrea Walton (f; default)
 PTS5 winners:  José Abraham Estrada Sierra (m) /  Ruth-Ann Reeves (f; default)
 PTVI winners:  Charles Edouard Catherine (m) /  Amy Dixon (f)

World Triathlon Corporation (WTC)

2017 Main Ironman events

March
 March 4: 2017 Ironman New Zealand Championship in  Taupo 
 Pro winners:  Braden Currie (m) /  Jocelyn McCauley (f)

April
 April 2: 2017 Ironman African Championship in  Port Elizabeth
 Pro winners:  Ben Hoffman (m) /  Daniela Ryf (f)
 April 22: 2017 Ironman North American Championship in  The Woodlands, Texas
 Pro winners:  Matt Hanson (m) /  Jodie Robertson (f)

May
 May 6: 2017 Ironman Australia Championship in  Port Macquarie
 Pro winners:  David Dellow (m) /  Laura Siddall (f)
 May 20: 2017 Ironman Lanzarote Championship in the  Canary Islands
 Pro winners:  Bart Aernouts (m) /  Lucy Charles (f)
 May 28: 2017 Ironman Brazil Championship in  Florianópolis
 Pro winners:  Tim Don (m) /  Susie Cheetham (f)

June
 June 11: 2017 Ironman Boulder Championship in the 
 Pro winners:  Timothy O'Donnell (m) /  Rachel Joyce (f)
 June 11: 2017 Ironman Asia-Pacific Championship in  Cairns
 Pro winners:  Joshua Amberger (m) /  Sarah Crowley (f)

July
 July 2: 2017 Ironman Austria-Kärnten Championship in  Klagenfurt
 Pro winners:  Jan Frodeno (m) /  Eva Wutti (f)
 July 9: 2017 Ironman European Championship in  Frankfurt
 Pro winners:  Sebastian Kienle (m) /  Sarah Crowley (f)
 July 16: 2017 Ironman United Kingdom Championship in  Bolton
 Pro winners:  Cyril Viennot (m) /  Lucy Gossage (f)
 July 23: 2017 Ironman Lake Placid Championship in the 
 Pro winners:  Brent McMahon (m) /  Amy Farrell (f)
 July 23: 2017 Ironman France Championship in  Nice
 Pro winners:  Frederik Van Lierde (m) /  Carrie Lester (f)
 July 29: 2017 Ironman Santa Rosa Championship in the 
 Pro winners:  Nicholas Noone (m) /  Chealsea Tiner (f)
 July 30: 2017 Ironman Switzerland Championship in  Zürich
 Pro winners:  Nicholas Kastelein (m) /  Céline Schärer (f)
 July 30: 2017 Ironman Canada Championship in  Whistler & Pemberton
 Pro winners:  Dylan Gleeson (m) /  Linsey Corbin (f)

August
 August 6: 2017 Ironman Maastricht-Limburg Championship in the 
 Pro winners:  Michael Weiss (m) /  Saleta Castro (f)
 August 13: 2017 Ironman Hamburg Championship in 
 Pro winners:  James Cunnama (m) /  Daniela Sämmler (f)
 August 19: 2017 Ironman Kalmar Championship in 
 Men's Pro winner:  Clemente Alonso-Mckernan
 August 20: 2017 Ironman Mont-Tremblant Championship in 
 Pro winners:  Marino Vanhoenacker (m) /  Rachel Joyce (f)
 August 20: 2017 Ironman Copenhagen Championship in 
 Pro winners:  Pedro Jose Bastida Andujar (m) /  Michelle Vesterby (f)
 August 27: 2017 Ironman Coeur d'Alene Championship in the 
 Pro winners:  Mark Saroni (m) /  Haley Cooper-Scott (f)
 August 27: 2017 Ironman Vichy Championship in  Auvergne-Rhône-Alpes
 Pro winners:  Bruno Clerbout (m) /  Stefanie Adam (f)

September
 September 10: 2017 Ironman Wisconsin Championship in  Madison
 Men's Pro winner:  Luke McKenzie
 September 10: 2017 Ironman Gurye Championship in 
 Pro winners:  Thomas Frühwirth (m) /  Jessica Jacobs (f)
 September 10: 2017 Ironman Wales Championship in  Pembrokeshire
 Pro winners:  Cameron Wurf (m) /  Lucy Gossage (f)
 September 23: 2017 Ironman Emilia-Romagna Championship in  Cervia
 Pro winners:  Andreas Dreitz (m) /  Lucy Gossage (f)
 September 24: 2017 Ironman Chattanooga Championship in the 
 Pro winners:  Villu Vakra (m) /  Liz Lyles (f)
 September 30: 2017 Ironman Barcelona Championship in  Calella
 Pro winners:  Antony Costes (m) /  Yvonne van Vlerken (f)

October
 October 1: 2017 Ironman Taiwan Championship in  Penghu
 Pro winners:  Kevin Collington (m) /  Laurel Wassner (f)
 October 7: 2017 Ironman Maryland Championship in  Cambridge
 Pro winners:  D.J. Snyder (m) /  Molly Smith (f)
 October 14: 2017 Ironman World Championship in  Kailua-Kona, Hawaii
 Pro winners:  Patrick Lange (m) /  Daniela Ryf (f)
 October 15: 2017 Ironman Louisville Championship in the 
 Pro winners:  Andrew Starykowicz (m) /  Lisa Roberts (f)

November
 November 4: 2017 Ironman Florida Championship in  Panama City Beach
 Pro winners:  James Burke (m) /  Elyse Gallegos (f)
 November 11: 2017 Ironman Malaysia Championship in  Langkawi
 Pro winners:  Romain Guillaume (m) /  Diana Riesler (f)
 November 12: 2017 Ironman Los Cabos Championship in 
 Pro winners:  Juan Valencia (m) /  Amy Javens (f)
 November 19: 2017 Ironman Arizona Championship in  Tempe
 Pro winners:  Lionel Sanders (m) /  Kaisa Sali (f)
 November 26: 2017 Ironman Cozumel Championship in 
 Pro winners:  Sebastian Kienle (m) /  Lisa Roberts (f)

December
 December 3: 2017 Ironman Mar del Plata Championship in 
 Pro winners:  Matt Chrabot (m) /  Sarah Piampiano (f)
 December 3: 2017 Ironman Western Australia Championship in  Busselton
 Pro winners:  Terenzo Bozzone (m) /  Melissa Hauschildt (f)

2017 Ironman 70.3 events
 January
 January 15: 2017 Ironman 70.3 Pucón in 
 Pro winners:  Lionel Sanders (m) /  Bárbara Riveros (f)
 January 27: 2017 Ironman 70.3 Dubai in the 
 Pro winners:  Javier Gómez (m) /  Daniela Ryf (f)
 January 29: 2017 Ironman 70.3  in Buffalo City Metropolitan Municipality
 Pro winners:  Romain Guillaume (m) /  Jodie Cunnama (f)
 February
 February 19: 2017 Ironman 70.3 Geelong in 
 Pro winners:  Sam Appleton (m) /  Annabel Luxford (f)
 March
 March 4: 2017 Ironman 70.3  in Taupo
 Pro winners:  Jai Davies-Campbell (m) /  Rebecca Elliott (f)
 March 11: 2017 Ironman 70.3 Saipan in the 
 Pro winners:  LEE Kwang-hoon (m) /  CHOI Suk-hyeon (f)
 March 12: 2017 Ironman 70.3 Subic Bay in the 
 Pro winners:  Ruedi Wild (m) /  Radka Kahlefeldt (f)
 March 12: 2017 Ironman 70.3 Buenos Aires in 
 Pro winners:  Lionel Sanders (m) /  Haley Chura (f)
 March 19: 2017 Ironman 70.3 Taiwan in Taitung City
 Pro winners:  Ruedi Wild (m) /  Bárbara Riveros (f)
 March 19: 2017 Ironman 70.3  in San Juan
 Pro winners:  Taylor Reid (m) /  Alicia Kaye (f)
 March 19: 2017 Ironman 70.3 Campeche in 
 Pro winners:  Tim Don (m) /  Heather Wurtele (f)
 April
 April 1: 2017 Ironman 70.3 Oceanside in the 
 Pro winners:  Lionel Sanders (m) /  Holly Lawrence (f)
 April 1: 2017 Ironman 70.3 Liuzhou in 
 Pro winners:  Tim Don (m) /  Jeanni Seymour (f)
 April 2: 2017 Ironman 70.3 Texas in  Galveston
 Pro winners:  Mauricio Mendez Cruz (m) /  Kimberley Morrison (f)
 April 9:  2017 Ironman 70.3 Florida in  Haines City
 Pro winners:  Michael Poole (m) /  Sara Gibson (f)
 April 23: 2017 Ironman 70.3  in Lima
 Pro winners:  Andy Potts (m) /  Heather Jackson (f)
 April 23: 2017 Ironman 70.3 Palmas in 
 Pro winners:  Igor Amorelli (m) /  Beatriz Neres (f)
 May
 May 6: 2017 Ironman 70.3 St. George in the 
 Pro winners:  Alistair Brownlee (m) /  Holly Lawrence (f)
 May 7: 2017 Ironman 70.3  in Da Nang
 Pro winners:  Tim Berkel (m) /  Anna Eberhardt (f)
 May 7: 2017 Ironman 70.3 Port Macquarie in 
 Pro winners:  Blake Kappler (m) /  Laura Brown (f)
 May 7: 2017 Ironman 70.3 Saint Croix in the 
 Pro winners:  Francky Favre (m) /  Rebecca McKee (f)
 May 7: 2017 Ironman 70.3 Busselton in 
 Pro winners:  Dan Wilson (m) /  Katey Gibb (f)
 May 13: 2017 Ironman 70.3 Gulf Coast in  Panama City Beach
 Pro winners:  Tyler Jordan (m) /  Rachel Olson (f)
 May 13: 2017 Ironman 70.3 Santa Rosa in the 
 Pro winners:  Sam Appleton (m) /  Holly Lawrence (f)
 May 13: 2017 Ironman 70.3 Mallorca in 
 Pro winners:  David McNamee (m) /  Laura Philipp (f)
 May 14: 2017 Ironman 70.3 Monterrey in 
 Pro winners:  Kevin Collington (m) /  Jeanni Seymour (f)
 May 14: 2017 Ironman 70.3 Pays d'Aix in  Aix-en-Provence
 Pro winners:  Bertrand Billard (m) /  Emma Bilham (f)
 May 21: 2017 Ironman 70.3 Chattanooga in the 
 Pro winners:  Matthew Russell (m) /  Heather Jackson (f)
 May 21: 2017 Ironman 70.3 Barcelona in  Calella
 Pro winners:  Jan Frodeno (m) /  Emma Pallant (f)
 May 21: 2017 Ironman 70.3 St. Pölten in 
 Pro winners:  Nils Frommhold (m) /  Laura Philipp (f)
 June
 June 3: 2017 Ironman 70.3 Hawaii in the 
 Pro winners:  John Newsom (m) /  Bree Wee (f)
 June 4: 2017 Ironman 70.3 Victoria in 
 Pro winners:  Marko Albert (m) /  Kelsey Withrow (f)
 June 4: 2017 Ironman 70.3 Raleigh in the 
 Pro winners:  Tyler Butterfield (m) /  Stephanie Roy (f)
 June 11: 2017 Ironman 70.3 Eagleman in  Cambridge, Maryland
 Pro winners:  Sam Appleton (m) /  Lindsey Jerdonek (f)
 June 11: 2017 Ironman 70.3 Cairns in 
 Pro winners:  Dan Plews (m) /  Madi Roberts (f)
 June 11: 2017 Ironman 70.3 Wisconsin in the 
 Pro winners:  Ryan Giuliano (m) /  Danielle Vsetecka (f)
 June 11: 2017 Ironman 70.3 Tokoname in 
 Pro winners:  Ryan Fisher (m) /  Laura Dennis (f)
 June 11: 2017 Ironman 70.3 Rapperswil-Jona in 
 Pro winners:  Ruedi Wild (m) /  Daniela Ryf (f)
 June 11: 2017 Ironman 70.3 Kraichgau in 
 Pro winners:  Sebastian Kienle (m) /  Laura Philipp (f)
 June 18: 2017 Ironman 70.3 Playas del Coco in 
 Pro winners:  Kevin Collington (m) /  Leanda Cave (f)
 June 18: 2017 Ironman 70.3 Syracuse in the 
 Pro winners:  Robert Hollinger (m) /  Amy Farrell (f)
 June 18: 2017 Ironman 70.3 Staffordshire in 
 Pro winners:  Guilio Molinari (m) /  Lucy Gossage (f)
 June 18: 2017 Ironman 70.3 Durban in 
 Pro winners:  Olivier Godart (m) /  Jade Nicole (f)
 June 18: 2017 Ironman 70.3 Region Moselle in 
 Pro winners:  Kenneth Vandendriessche (m) /  Alexandra Tondeur (f)
 June 18: 2017 Ironman 70.3 Pescara in 
 Pro winners:  Cyril Viennot (m) /  Lisa Huetthaler (f)
 June 18: 2017 Ironman 70.3 European Championship in  Elsinore
 Men's Pro winner:  Michael Raelert
 June 25: 2017 Ironman 70.3 Coeur d'Alene in the 
 Pro winners:  Matt Hanson (m) /  Haley Chura (f)
 June 25: 2017 Ironman 70.3 Exmoor in  Wimbleball Lake
 Pro winners:  Marton Cseik (m) /  Ruth Purbroo (f)
 June 25: 2017 Ironman 70.3 Buffalo Springs Lake in  Lubbock, Texas
 Pro winners:  Mark Saroni (m) /  Jennifer Davis (f)
 June 25: 2017 Ironman 70.3 Mont-Tremblant in 
 Pro winners:  Lionel Sanders (m) /  Holly Lawrence (f)
 July
 July 2: 2017 Ironman 70.3 Edinburgh in 
 Pro winners:  Andreas Raelert (m) /  Emma Pallant (f)
 July 2: 2017 Ironman 70.3 Austria-Kärnten in  Klagenfurt
 Pro winners:  Jan Frodeno (m) /  Eva Wutti (f)
 July 2: 2017 Ironman 70.3 Haugesund in 
 Men's Pro winner:  Allan Hovda
 July 8: 2017 Ironman 70.3 Muncie in the 
 Pro winners:  Daniel Stubleski (m) /  Dani Fischer (f)
 July 9: 2017 Ironman 70.3 Muskoka in 
 Pro winners:  Jérémy Morel (m) /  Fiona Whitby (f)
 July 9: 2017 Ironman 70.3 Jönköping in 
 Pro winners:  Josh Amberger (m) /  Lisa Huetthaler (f)
 July 16: 2017 Ironman 70.3 Racine in the 
 Pro winners:  Sam Appleton (m) /  Holly Lawrence (f)
 July 23: 2017 Ironman 70.3 Calgary in 
 Pro winners:  Josh Amberger (m) /  Heather Jackson (f)
 July 30: 2017 Ironman 70.3 Ecuador in  Manta
 Pro winners:  Reinaldo Colucci (m) /  Kelsey Withrow (f)
 July 30: 2017 Ironman 70.3 Ohio in  Delaware
 Pro winners:  Michael Vulanich (m) /  Peggy Yetman (f)
 July 30: 2017 Ironman 70.3 Canada in  Whistler
 Pro winners:  Graham Hood (m) /  Christine Hoffman (f)
 August
 August 5: 2017 Ironman 70.3 Boulder in the 
 Pro winners:  Tim Don (m) /  Jeanni Seymour (f)
 August 5: 2017 Ironman 70.3 Otepää in 
 Pro winners:  Johannes Moldan (m) /  Helle Frederiksen (f)
 August 6: 2017 Ironman 70.3 Alagoas in  Maceió
 Pro winners:  Francisco Sartore (m) /  Vanessa Gianinni (f)
 August 6: 2017 Ironman 70.3 Philippines in  Cebu
 Pro winners:  Tim Reed (m) /  Amelia Rose Watkinson (f)
 August 6: 2017 Ironman 70.3 Gdynia in 
 Pro winners:  Boris Stein (m) /  Lisa Huetthaler (f)
 August 13: 2017 Ironman 70.3 Steelhead in  Benton Harbor
 Men's Pro winner:  Andrew Starykowicz
 August 20: 2017 Ironman 70.3 Bintan in 
 Pro winners:  Mike Philips (m) /  Amelia Rose Watkinson (f)
 August 20: 2017 Ironman 70.3 Dublin in 
 Pro winners:  David McNamee (m) /  Sarah Lewis (f)
 August 26: 2017 Ironman 70.3 Vichy in 
 Pro winners:  Frederik Van Lierde (m) /  Jocelyn McCauley (f)
 August 27: 2017 Ironman 70.3 Maine in the 
 Pro winners:  David Bartlett (m) /  Ashley Forsyth (f)
 August 27: 2017 Ironman 70.3 Qujing in 
 Pro winners:  Domenico Passuello (m) /  Sarah Piampiano (f)
 August 27: 2017 Ironman 70.3 Zell am See-Kaprun in 
 Pro winners:  Boris Stein (m) /  Laura Philipp (f)
 September
 September 2: 2017 Ironman 70.3 Lanzarote in 
 Pro winners:  James Cunnama (m) /  Anne Haug (f)
 September 3: 2017 Ironman 70.3 Cascais in 
 Pro winners:  Denis Chevrot (m) /  Vanessa Fernandes (f)
 September 9 & 10: 2017 Ironman 70.3 World Championship in  Chattanooga, Tennessee
 Pro winners:  Javier Gómez (m) /  Daniela Ryf (f)
 September 10: 2017 Ironman 70.3 Sunshine Coast in  Mooloolaba
 Pro winners:  Dan Wilson (m) /  Katey Gibb (f)
 September 10: 2017 Ironman 70.3 Santa Cruz in the 
 Pro winners:  Braden Currie (m) /  Liz Lyles (f)
 September 10: 2017 Ironman 70.3 Lake Placid in the 
 Pro winners:  Jake Saunders (m) /  Amy Farrell (f)
 September 10: 2017 Ironman 70.3 Rügen in 
 Pro winners:  Patrick Lange (m) /  Anja Beranek (f)
 September 17: 2017 Ironman 70.3 Weymouth in 
 Pro winners:  James Cunnama (m) /  Katrien Verstuyft (f)
 September 17: 2017 Ironman 70.3 Pula in 
 Pro winners:  Stefan Haubner (m) /  Anna Przybilla (f)
 September 17: 2017 Ironman 70.3 Atlantic City in the 
 Pro winners:  Kiley Austin-Young (m) /  Sharon Schmidt-Mongrain (f)
 September 24: 2017 Ironman 70.3 Superfrog in  Imperial Beach, California
 Pro winners:  Brett King (m) /  Meaghan Praznik (f)
 September 24: 2017 Ironman 70.3 Cozumel in 
 Pro winners:  Terenzo Bozzone (m) /  Stephanie Roy (f)
 September 24: 2017 Ironman 70.3 Augusta in the 
 Pro winners:  Jesse Thomas (m) /  Sarah True (f)
 October
 October 1: 2017 Ironman 70.3 Rio de Janeiro in 
 Pro winners:  Paulo Roberto Maciel da Silva (m) /  Pâmella Oliveira (f)
 October 15: 2017 Ironman 70.3 Turkey in  Belek
 Pro winners:  Jeren Seegers (m) /  Sara van de Vel (f)
 October 21: 2017 Ironman 70.3 North Carolina in  Wilmington
 Pro winners:  Tom Clifford (m) /  Lisa Becharas (f)
 October 21: 2017 Ironman 70.3 Coquimbo in 
 Pro winners:  Santiago Ascenco (m) /  Luãza Cravo (f)
 October 22: 2017 Ironman 70.3 Arizona in  Tempe
 Pro winners:  Paul Stevenson (m) /  Sophie Chevrier (f)
 October 22: 2017 Ironman 70.3 New Orleans in the 
 October 22: 2017 Ironman 70.3 Miami in the 
 Pro winners:  Igor Amorelli (m) /  Ellie Salthouse (f)
 October 29: 2017 Ironman 70.3 Waco in the 
 October 29: 2017 Ironman 70.3 Austin in the 
 Pro winners:  Franz Loeschke (m) /  Sarah True (f)
 November
 November 11: 2017 Ironman 70.3 Langkawi in 
 Pro winners:  Rob Shannon (m) /  Melissa Bittner (f)
 November 12: 2017 Ironman 70.3 Los Cabos in 
 Pro winners:  Terenzo Bozzone (m) /  Jeanni Seymour (f)
 November 12: 2017 Ironman 70.3 Xiamen in 
 Pro winners:  Sam Betten (m) /  Eimear Mullan (f)
 November 25: 2017 Ironman 70.3 Middle East Championship in  Manama
 Pro winners:  Kristian Blummenfelt (m) /  Holly Lawrence (f)
 November 26: 2017 Ironman 70.3 Fortaleza in 
 Pro winners:  José Belarmino (m) /  Claudia Dumont (f)
 November 26: 2017 Ironman 70.3 Thailand in  Phuket City
 Pro winners:  Markus Rolli (m) /  Imogen Simmonds (f)
 November 26: 2017 Ironman 70.3 Asia-Pacific Championship in  Western Sydney
 Pro winners:  Dan Wilson (m) /  Melissa Hauschildt (f)
 November 26: 2017 Ironman 70.3 Punta del Este in 
 Pro winners:  Kid Walter Tlaija (m) /  Andrea Castillo Sarmiento (f)
 December
 December 3: 2017 Ironman 70.3 Western Australia in  Busselton
 Pro winners:  Owain Matthews (m) /  Caroline Anderson (f)
 December 3: 2017 Ironman 70.3 Cartagena in 
 Pro winners:  Kevin Collington (m) /  Diana Castillo (f)
 December 9: 2017 Ironman 70.3 Taupo in 
 Pro winners:  Mike Phillips (m) /  Amelia Rose Watkinson (f)

References

External links
 International Triathlon Union
 IRONMAN Official Site

 
Triathlon by year